Caldwell–Hampton–Boylston House is a historic home located at Columbia, South Carolina. It was built between 1820 and 1830, and is a three-story, five bay, clapboard clad frame dwelling in the Greek Revival style. It features a two-story, projecting front porch. Also on the property is contributing ironwork and brick fencing (c. 1855), and a stable/carriage house, garden gazebo, and tea house. In 1874–1876, it was the residence of South Carolina Reconstruction governor Daniel H. Chamberlain, who purchased the house in 1869.

It was added to the National Register of Historic Places in 1971.  It is located in Columbia Historic District I.

References

Houses on the National Register of Historic Places in South Carolina
Greek Revival houses in South Carolina
Houses completed in 1830
Houses in Columbia, South Carolina
National Register of Historic Places in Columbia, South Carolina
1830 establishments in South Carolina
Historic district contributing properties in South Carolina